Naudedrillia perardua is a species of sea snail, a marine gastropod mollusk in the family Pseudomelatomidae, the turrids and allies.

Description
The length of the shell attains 22 mm.

Distribution
This marine species occurs off Transkei to KwaZulu-Natal, South Africa.

References

 Kilburn R.N. (1988). Turridae (Mollusca: Gastropoda) of southern Africa and Mozambique. Part 4. Subfamilies Drillinae, Crassispirinae and Strictispirinae. Annals of the Natal Museum. 29(1): 167-320

External links
 
 Gastropods.com: Naudedrillia perardua

Endemic fauna of South Africa
perardua
Gastropods described in 1988